The Smart Set Athletic Club was an athletic club based in Brooklyn, NY. The club organized the first African-American basketball team, one of the most successful teams in the Black Fives Era.

History 
Founded in 1904, the Smart Set Athletic Club is credited with assembling the first formal fully independent African-American basketball team. The team debuted in 1907. The Smart Set Athletic Club team was also a founding member of the Olympian Athletic League, along with the Alpha Physical Culture Club, the Marathon Athletic Club of Manhattan, and the St. Christopher Club.

Smart Set members came from a background of well-educated, affluent African Americans who resided in what at the time was a predominantly white Stuyvesant Heights neighborhood of Brooklyn.

References 

Basketball teams in New York City
Athletics clubs in the United States